The Second American Revolution is a rhetorical or hyperbolic historiographical term that has been invoked on a number of occasions throughout the history of the United States. While it has been used as a metonym for past events, another ideological as well as political revolution has also been called for by some groups.

Interpretations
 A second American revolution was conceived early on as attainable via the Article V Convention, as set forth in the U.S. Constitution. Occasional conventions were envisioned by many of the country's founding generation of leaders to be a sort of institutionalized avenue toward the ideal of revolution every twenty years, often attributed to Thomas Jefferson. According to Samuel Williams of Vermont (1743–1817), it was to be the means to accomplish periodic constitutional adaptation to changing times. Born the same year as Jefferson, Williams saw the federal constitutional convention as the vehicle for what loose constructionists today term the "living, breathing constitution."
The Confederation Period, starting with the 1783 signing of the Treaty of Paris and culminating with the approval of the Constitution of the United States, has been considered by historian Joseph Ellis as a second revolution in itself since "no mobs rampaged in [the Constitution's] favor" but was propelled by the Founding Fathers.
 The War of 1812 between the United States and the United Kingdom is sometimes referred to as the second American Revolution, stemming from the second British recognition of 1781 American borders. John C. Calhoun was perhaps the first to make this claim.
The arrest and subsequent trial, though in reality "a hearing to determine ownership," of Anthony Burns, a 19-year-old fugitive slave, radicalized certain sectors of Boston society. Richard Henry Dana Jr. of the Boston Vigilance Committee made an unsuccessful plea for Burn's freedom, Amos A. Lawrence donated to Burn's defense fund, Theodore Parker wrote extensively on the subject, Thomas Wentworth Higginson was motivated to become one of the Secret Six supporting John Brown as well as heading the 1st South Carolina Volunteers, the first federally authorized black regiment, during the Civil War, and it gave rise to the Republican Party, with John Greenleaf Whittier and William Lloyd Garrison collaborating on the party's formation. Historian Albert J von Frank considered the case "at the heart of a revolution that had its own particular Bastille and riot, that toppled a government in Massachusetts, destroyed certain political parties, and extemporized others."
 Historian Charles A. Beard first proposed—in 1927—that the US Civil War and emancipation amounted to a second American revolution, emphasizing the changes brought on by the Union's victory. Subsequently, many historians—including James M. McPherson, Gregory P. Downs, and Bruce Levine—have argued that the fight against and victory over slavery amounts to a second American Revolution.
The social and political movements such as the counterculture of the 1960s and the 1970s were considered by David Talbot, Salon.com-founder, and his sister, The New Yorker staff writer Margaret Talbot, a sudden change in their book By the Light of Burning Dreams: The Triumphs and Tragedies of the Second American Revolution. The movements identified by the Talbot siblings were "Black Power, gay pride, the anti-war movement, the siege of Wounded Knee, the battle for abortion rights, the rise of the United Farm Workers, and the “celebrity activism” embodied by John Lennon and Yoko Ono."
The foreign policy of the George W. Bush administration, and in particular the War on Terror following the September 11 attacks, had been called by Dominique Moïsi, co-founder of the Institut Français des Relations Internationales, "the coming together of revolutionary military means and revolutionary ideas with Iraq as the ideal testing-ground," designating the resulting the implementation of these as "democratic bolshevism."

Attempted or proposed revolutions 

 When reviewing Ferdinand Lundberg's study of the Constitution of the United States, Cracks in the Constitution, for The New York Review of Books, Gore Vidal considered that a Second Constitutional Convention of the United States was overdue, writing "[t]he First Constitution will be two hundred years old in 1987—as good a date as any to finish the work of the second constitutional convention, which will make possible our Fourth Republic, and first —ah, the note of optimism!—civilization." Vidal deemed the 1787 unamended document as the inaugural constitution, followed by the creation of a "Second Constitution" in 1793 with the ratification of the Bill of Rights and culminating with the "radical alterations made by the Thirteenth, Fourteenth, and Fifteenth amendments," that created a third in 1865. Nevertheless, these development were not considered as revolutions in themselves, but "three Constitutions for three quite different republics." The review-essay was subsequently included and used as the eponymous title for a collection of Vidal's essays.
Ronald Reagan, in his 1985 State of the Union Address, mentioned the phrase four times, considering it "a revolution carrying us to new heights of progress by pushing back frontiers of knowledge and space; a revolution of spirit that taps the soul of America, enabling us to summon greater strength than we've ever known; and, a revolution that carries beyond our shores the golden promise of human freedom in a world at peace." He then went on to state that "freedom - is the key to the Second American Revolution that we mean to bring about," as well as tax simplification, welfare cuts and space exploration as components of said revolution.
Timothy McVeigh, perpetrator of the Oklahoma City bombing, wished "to spark a second American Revolution" through his terrorist attack. In addition McVeigh had also expressed in a letter to the Lockport Union-Sun & Journal his opposition to taxes, his perception of American decline as well as the possibility of a Second American Civil War, writing "What is it going to take to open the eyes of our elected officials? America is in serious decline!...Is a Civil War Imminent? Do we have to shed blood to reform the current system? I hope it doesn't come to that. But it might."
In their book, Tea Party Patriots: The Second American Revolution, the founders of the Tea Party Patriots, Mark Meckler and Jenny Beth Martin, propose a plan "to restore America to greatness." The book includes the use of quotes by Thomas Jefferson and James Madison, as well as Ronald Reagan and Margaret Thatcher, espousing right-wing beliefs in small government, weak public-employee unions, low taxes, efforts to repeal the Affordable Care Act, American exceptionalism and the use of educational vouchers.
When discussing The FairTax Book, which promotes the flat tax proposal and the complete dismantling of the Internal Revenue Service, with The Atlanta Journal-Constitution co-author and then-Congressman John Linder said of the proposition "[t]he FairTax would be a second American revolution. It excites the imagination of the American people, and if they get behind it and push, it can happen. It is not pie in the sky. This is a workable plan, a plan that can be great for the American people and American business. We need people who are asking how to do it, not offering reasons why we can't do it. The Berlin Wall fell. The Soviet Union is no more. Roseanne [Barr] lost weight."

See also
 Second American Civil War
Second Constitutional Convention of the United States
 American militia movement
 Patriot movement
 American Revolution

References

American Revolution
Fictional wars
History of the United States
Possible future wars
War of 1812
United Kingdom–United States relations